Dashi Township may refer to the following locations in the People's Republic of China:

 Dashi Township, Hunan (大市乡), in Leiyang
 Dashi Township, Zhejiang (跶石乡), in Longquan
Written as "大石乡":
 Dashi Township, Anhui, in Taihu County
 Dashi Township, Chongqing, in Dianjiang County
 Dashi Township, Gansu, in Gangu County
 Dashi Township, Jiangxi, in Guangfeng County
 Dashi Township, Xuyong County, in Xuyong County, Sichuan
 Dashi Township, Yuechi County, in Yuechi County, Sichuan